Several ships of the Imperial Russian Navy have been named Gromoboi (meaning thunderer)

  – a 3,200-ton  screw frigate built by Ulricaborgs skeppsvarf, Helsinki. 53 guns, 400 horsepower steam engine, length 63 meters. 
  – a 12,455-ton armoured cruiser built by the Baltic Works, St Petersburg.

Russian Navy ship names